A mixed affective state, formerly known as a mixed-manic or mixed episode, has been defined as a state wherein features unique to both depression and  mania—such as episodes of despair, doubt, anguish, rage or homicidal ideation, suicidal ideation, splitting, racing thoughts, sensory overload, pressure of activity, and heightened irritability—occur either simultaneously or in very short succession.

Previously, the diagnostic criteria for both a manic and depressive episode had to be met in a consistent and sustained fashion, with symptoms enduring for at least a week (or any duration if psychiatric hospitalization was required), thereby restricting the official acknowledgement of mixed affective states to only a minority of patients with bipolar I disorder. In current DSM-5 nomenclature, however, a "mixed episode" no longer stands as an episode of illness unto itself; rather, the symptomology specifier "with mixed features" can be applied to any major affective episode (manic, hypomanic, or depressive), meaning that they are now officially recognized in patients with, in addition to bipolar I disorder, bipolar II disorder and, by convention, major depressive disorder. A depressive mixed state in a patient, however, even in the absence of discrete periods of mania or hypomania, effectively rules out unipolar depression.

Diagnostic criteria 
As affirmed by the Diagnostic and Statistical Manual of Mental Disorders, fifth edition (DSM-5), the symptomology specifier "with mixed features" can be applied to manic episodes of bipolar I disorder, hypomanic episodes of either bipolar I disorder or bipolar II disorder and depressive episodes of either bipolar disorder or major depressive disorder, with at least three concurrent features of the opposite polarity being present. As a result, the presence of "mixed features" are now recognized in patients with bipolar II disorder and major depression; as earlier noted, however, although it is customary to withhold a diagnosis of a bipolar disorder until a manic or hypomanic episode appears, the presence of such features in a depressed patient even with no history of discrete mania or hypomania is strongly suggestive of the disorder.

Nevertheless, the DSM-5's narrower definition of mixed episodes may result in fewer patients meeting mixed criteria compared to DSM-IV. A call was made by Tohen in 2017 for introducing changes from a currently phenomenological to a target oriented approach to DSM-5 mixed mood criteria in order to achieve more personalized medical attention. 

Two features of both mania or hypomania and depression may superficially overlap and even resemble each other, namely "an increase in goal-directed activity" (psychomotor acceleration) vs. psychomotor agitation and "flight of ideas" and "racing thoughts" vs. depressive rumination. Attending to the patient's experiences is very important. In the psychomotor agitation commonly seen in depression, the "nervous energy" is always overshadowed by a strong sense of exhaustion and manifests as purposeless movements (e.g., pacing, hand-wringing); in psychomotor acceleration, however, the excess in movement stems from an abundance of energy and is often channelled and purposeful. Likewise, in depressive rumination, the patient experiences the repetitive thoughts as heavy, leaden, and plodding; in psychic acceleration, however, (as seen in mania  or hypomania) the thoughts move in a rapid progression, with many themes, rather than a singular one, being touched upon. Even when such experiences are accounted for on the basis of depression, the possibility does still exist, however, that the depressive episode may be complicated by other manic or hypomanic symptoms, in which case it is often prudent to attend to the patient's personal and family history (e.g., family history of bipolar disorder, early age of onset) to determine whether or not the patient has bipolar disorder.

Treatment 
Treatment of mixed states is typically based upon administration of mood stabilizing medication, which may include anticonvulsants such as valproic acid; atypical antipsychotics such as quetiapine, olanzapine, aripiprazole, and ziprasidone; or first-generation antipsychotics such as haloperidol. There is question of lithium's efficacy for treatment of mixed states due to conflicting conclusions drawn from various trials and research. Mood stabilizers work to reduce the manic symptoms associated with the mixed state, but they are not considered particularly effective for improving concurrent depressive symptoms.

See also
 Post-traumatic stress disorder
 Dopamine
 Mania
 Hyperthymic temperament
 Cyclothymia
 Narcissistic personality disorder
 Borderline personality disorder

References

External links 

Bipolar disorder
Mania